The 1987 E3 Harelbeke was the 30th edition of the E3 Harelbeke cycle race and was held on 26 March 1987. The race started and finished in Harelbeke. The race was won by Eddy Planckaert of the Panasonic team.

General classification

References

1987 in Belgian sport
1987